Hereford High School is a public high school located in Hereford, Texas, United States and classified as a 4A school by the University Interscholastic League (UIL). It is part of the Hereford Independent School District located in central Deaf Smith County. In 2016, the school was rated "Met Standard" by the Texas Education Agency.

Athletics
The Hereford Whitefaces compete in the following sports:

Baseball
Basketball
Cross Country
Football
Golf
Softball
Tennis
Track
Volleyball
Wrestling

State titles
Girls Cross Country 
2005(4A), 2006(4A), 2007(4A)
Volleyball 
1996(4A), 1997(4A), 1999(4A), 2001(4A), 2008(4A)
Team Tennis 
2020(4A)

Notable alumni
Parker Bridwell, baseball player

References

External links
Hereford ISD

Schools in Deaf Smith County, Texas
Public high schools in Texas